Abdullah Qutb Shah (also transliterated in different ways) was the seventh ruler of the kingdom of Golconda in southern India under the Qutb Shahi dynasty. He ruled from 1626 to 1672.

Abdullah, son of Sultan Muhammad Qutb Shah, was a polyglot, and a lover of poetry and music. He invited to his court and respected Kshetrayya, a famous lyric writer.  Kshetrayya is known for his romantic poetry.

Reign 
His reign was full of sorrow and trouble. His only success was demolishing the decayed Vijayanagara Empire by capturing Vellore, last capital of it in 1633 with the help of his wazir Mir Jumla. Aurangzeb under the command from Shah Jahan took over Hyderabad by surprise and restricted Abdullah within the Golconda fort. Abdullah worked hard to negotiate reasonable terms of surrender but the Mughals forced him into accepting severe conditions. However, the severe terms were sweetened by a matrimonial alliance between the two families: Abdullah's second daughter, known as Padshah Bibi Sahiba, was married to Aurangzeb's eldest son, Muhammad Sultan Mirza. She was his first wife, and so the chances of her progeny becoming Mughal emperor were great. However it did not ultimately happen.
He was also quite interested in mathematics that although being a  Muslim, he favoured many Europeans  who excelled in mathematics. 

This unhappy monarch died in 1672 and was succeeded by his son-in-law, Abul Hasan Qutb Shah.

Family
Abdullah had three daughters.
eldest daughter: married the Mughal prince Muhammad Sultan.
second daughter: married Sayyid Nizamuddin Ahmad, a maternal nephew of Abbas II of Persia.
Badshah Bibi: married Abul Hasan Qutb Shah.

See also
 Abul Hasan Qutb Shah
 Qutb Shahi dynasty

References

   
   

    *Tomb of Abdullah Qutb Shah.

Year of birth unknown
1672 deaths
Qutb Shahi dynasty